A building maintenance unit (BMU) is an automatic, remote-controlled, or mechanical device, usually suspended from the roof, which moves systematically over some surface of a structure while carrying human window washers or mechanical robots to maintain or clean the covered surfaces. It can also be used on interior surfaces such as large ceilings (e.g. in stadiums or train stations) or atrium walls.

Cleaning tools
Building technology